A by-election was held in the Vaimauga 3 constituency in Samoa on 24 February 2023. The by-election was triggered by the death of the incumbent member of parliament Tapunuu Niko Lee Hang of the Human Rights Protection Party (HRPP), in November 2022. A constituency widely considered an HRPP stronghold, former shipping executive Lautimuia Uelese Vaʻai of the ruling Faʻatuatua i le Atua Samoa ua Tasi (FAST) party won the by-election with 56%. He defeated the Samau Leatigagaeono Timani of the opposition HRPP, who obtained 39%, and Independent candidate Feagaimaalii Bruce Toomalatai who garnered 3%.

Candidates 

Three candidates qualified to contest the by-election: former Samoa First Party leader Feagaimaalii Bruce Toomalatai as an Independent, former Samoa Shipping Corporation general manager and nephew of former prime minister Vaai Kolone, Lautimuia Uelese Vaai of the governing FAST party and Samau Leatigagaeono Timani of the opposition HRPP. Businesswoman Tupuola Theresa Finau was unable to run due to her village being unrecognised by the government.

Campaign

Lautimuia Uelese Vaai 

Lautimuia Uelese Vaai of the FAST party, who unsuccessfully contested the 2016 general election, resigned from his position as chief executive of the Samoa Shipping Corporation before the poll. Lautimuia campaigned on a platform emphasising education, employment and business, citing that most residents of the urban Vaimauga 3 constituency reside on freehold real estate and depend on employment businesses.

Feagaimaalii Bruce Toomalatai 

Independent candidate Feagaimaalii Bruce Toomalatai previously contested the constituency in the 2021 general election where he placed third. Feagaimaalii criticised the allocation of land in the constituency for the extension of a local dam, which he claimed risked damaging the property of constituents residing in flat low, elevation areas. The independent candidate also expressed dissatisfaction with the amount of funding the Vaimauga 3 development committee received, which was WS$150,000, which he believed was inadequate. Feagaimaalii called for an increase in funding to boost programs that help combat the rising cost of living.

Conduct

Pre-polling 

Pre-polling for early voters occurred on 22 February and the polls on that day were open from 9:00 to 16:00 local time (UTC+13:00). Voters were required to apply to cast an early vote, if they wished to do so. A total of 170 individuals were registered for the pre-poll, which included healthcare workers, police officers and voters with a disability. The electoral commission assured early voters that a failure to not vote on the pre-polling day would not disqualify them from casting their ballots on the day of the by-election. Turnout on the day of pre-polling saw 122 individuals cast an early vote.

Election day 

On by-election day, polling stations were open from 8:00 to 15:00 (UTC+13). The electoral commission set up a voting booth in Salelologa for voters in Savaiʻi on the polling day. Polling officials provided a mobile voting service for voters unable to travel to polling booths. Voting was compulsory, and registered individuals who failed to vote faced a WS$100 fine. The electoral commission warned candidates and voters not to engage in illegal practices such as bribery and treating and reminded participants that candidates directly transporting electors was unlawful.

Results 

The preliminary count showed FAST candidate Lautimuia Uelese Vaʻai to have won. Despite the enforcement of compulsory voting, only 2,737 of the constituency's 4,781 registered voters participated in the by-election. In the final count, Lautimuia's majority increased to 1,531 votes, confirming his victory, while the HRPP's Samau Leatigagaeono Timani received 1,082. Independent candidate Feagaimaalii Bruce Toomalatai placed a distant third with 106 votes. Lautimuia's victory was notable due to the constituency's reputation as an HRPP stronghold, and his win increased FAST's parliamentary majority to 32 seats.

References

By-election
By-elections to the Legislative Assembly of Samoa
Samoa